I Am a Criminal is a 1938 American crime film directed by William Nigh and written by John W. Krafft. The film stars John Carroll, Kay Linaker, Craig Reynolds, Martin Spellman, Lester Matthews and Mary Kornman. The film was released on December 7, 1938, by Monogram Pictures.

Plot

Cast          
John Carroll as Brad McArthur
Kay Linaker as Linda La Rue
Craig Reynolds as Clint Reynolds
Martin Spellman as Bobby
Lester Matthews as District Attorney George Lane
Mary Kornman as Alice Martin
May Beatty as Maggie
Robert Fiske as Attorney Phil Collins
Byron Foulger as Ed Harper
Edward Earle as Clark
Jack Kennedy as Sheriff
Allan Cavan as DeMotte

References

External links
 

1938 films
American crime films
1938 crime films
Monogram Pictures films
Films directed by William Nigh
American black-and-white films
1930s English-language films
1930s American films
English-language crime films